Sidorovka is a rural locality (a selo) and the administrative center of Sidorovsky Selsoviet, Romanovsky District, Altai Krai, Russia. The population was 1,287 as of 2013. There are 8 streets.

Geography 
Sidorovka is located 38 km west of Romanovo (the district's administrative centre) by road. Zakladnoye is the nearest rural locality.

References 

Rural localities in Romanovsky District, Altai Krai